Hylastes opacus is a species of crenulate bark beetle in the family Curculionidae. It is found in North America and Europe.

References

Further reading

External links

 

Scolytinae
Articles created by Qbugbot
Beetles described in 1836